Larry Coryell at the Village Gate is a live album by jazz guitarist Larry Coryell that was recorded on January 21 and 22, 1971 at the Village Gate in New York City. It was released by Vanguard Records. This was the first album on which his wife Julie Coryell sang. The album included a cover version of a song by Jack Bruce with whom Coryell toured in 1968.

Rolling Stone stated the album showed Coryell with a power-trio in rock form. In his memoir, Coryell stated that Bronson and Wilkinson formed a tight rhythm-section, although it may seem an odd combination. His son Murali appeared on the album jacket.

Track listing

Personnel
 Larry Coryell – guitar, vocals
 Julie Coryell – vocals on "Beyond These Chilling Winds"
 Mervin Bronson – bass
 Harry Wilkinson – drums

References

1971 albums
Larry Coryell albums
Albums recorded at the Village Gate
Vanguard Records albums
Vanguard Records live albums